KASBI, Kongres Aliansi Serikat Buruh Indonesia (Congress of Indonesia Unions Alliance) is an Indonesian trade union formed in 2005 by 18 labor unions. In 2011, they were engaged in a strike action with Carrefour, a French retailer which operates a hypermarket chain in Indonesia. Carrefour had allegedly evaded strict Indonesian labor law by treating its employees as contract employees.

Notes

Trade unions in Indonesia